Einar Langfeldt (1 December 1884 – 19 September 1966) was a Norwegian physician. He was born in Kristiansand, and was a brother of Gabriel Langfeldt. He was appointed professor at the University of Oslo from 1925. Among his works is his thesis The partial pancreatectomy, and Lærebok i fysiologisk og medisinsk kjemi from 1928.

References

1884 births
1966 deaths
People from Kristiansand
20th-century Norwegian physicians
Academic staff of the University of Oslo
Norwegian textbook writers
Place of death missing